Pennefather is a surname. Notable people with the surname include:

Alice Pennefather (1902–1983), Singaporean sportswoman
David Pennefather (born 1945), British military figure; former Commandant General, Royal Marines
Edward Pennefather (1775–1847), Irish judge
Joan Pennefather, Canadian film and cultural executive
Sir John Pennefather (1798–1872), British soldier who won two very remarkable victories
Sir John Pennefather, 1st Baronet (1856–1933), British cotton merchant and Conservative politician
Richard Pennefather (judge) (1773–1859), Irish judge who conducted the Doneraile Conspiracy Trials of 1829
Richard Pennefather (Australian politician) (1851–1914), 9th Attorney-General of Western Australia
Rupert Pennefather, English dancer; principal dancer in the Royal Ballet Company
Shelly Pennefather (born c. 1966), American former professional basketball player, now a member of the Order of Saint Clare
William Pennefather (1816–1873), British missionary

See also
Pennefather River in Queensland, Australia, is located on western Cape York Peninsula